Aulichthys is a monospecific genus of marine ray-finned fish belonging to the family Aulorhynchidae. Its only species is Aulichthys japonicus, the tubenose, which is found in the shallow waters on the coasts of Japan, China and the Korean Peninsula  This species lays its eggs inside of the peribranchial cavities of ascidians.  This species grows to a length of  SL.

References
 

Aulorhynchidae
Monotypic fish genera